Australosuchus is an extinct monospecific genus of crocodylian belonging to the subfamily Mekosuchinae. The type and only known species Australosuchus clarkae lived during the Late Oligocene and the Early Miocene of southern Australia.  The generic name Australosuchus means "Southern crocodile".  It was described in 1991 from fossil material discovered at Lake Palankarinna in South Australia.

A 2018 tip dating study by Lee & Yates simultaneously using morphological, molecular (DNA sequencing), and stratigraphic (fossil age) data established the inter-relationships within Crocodilia, which was expanded upon in 2021 by Hekkala et al. using paleogenomics by extracting DNA from the extinct Voay.

The below cladogram from the latest studies shows the placement of Australosuchus within Mekosuchinae:

References

Mekosuchinae
Oligocene crocodylomorphs
Miocene crocodylomorphs
Cenozoic reptiles of Australia
Fossil taxa described in 1991
Taxa named by Ralph Molnar
Crocodiles of Australia
Prehistoric pseudosuchian genera